Hvitfeldt Hansen (30 July 1890 – 15 October 1964) was a Danish wrestler. He competed in the middleweight event at the 1912 Summer Olympics.

References

External links
 

1890 births
1964 deaths
Olympic wrestlers of Denmark
Wrestlers at the 1912 Summer Olympics
Danish male sport wrestlers
People from Esbjerg
Sportspeople from the Region of Southern Denmark
20th-century Danish people